Sagram Mandi (born 1 April 1988 in Kolkata) is an Indian footballer who is currently playing for Bhawanipore F.C. in the I-League 2nd Division. He plays as a defender and can also double up as a midfielder.

References

1979 births
Living people
Indian footballers
Footballers from Kolkata
I-League players
Mohun Bagan AC players
Bhawanipore FC players
Association football defenders
Association football midfielders